A La Cabaret is a 1916 silent comedy short directed and written by Walter Wright and starring Ora Carew, Joseph Belmont, Blanche Payson, and Joseph Callahan. The film premiered on August 19, 1916.

The black and white film was produced by Mack Sennett and the cinematographer was L.B. Jenkins.

Cast
Ora Carew
Joseph Belmont
Blanche Payson
Joseph Callahan 
Nick Cogley
Malcolm St. Clair
Lallah Rookh Hart

Crew

 Keystone Film Company production 
 distributed by Triangle Film Corporation
 Produced by Mack Sennett
 Production supervision by Mack Sennett
 Assistant director, Andy Anderson
 Cinematography by L.B. Jenkins

References

External links
 

1916 films
1910s English-language films
American black-and-white films
American silent short films
1916 comedy films
Silent American comedy films
1916 short films
American comedy short films
1910s American films